Tazehabad-e Gavmishan (also Romanized as Tāzehābād-e Gāvmīshān; also known as Tāzehābād) is a village in Yeylan-e Shomali Rural District, in the Central District of Dehgolan County, Kurdistan Province, Iran. At the 2006 census, its population was 159, in 36 families. The village is populated by Kurds.

References 

Towns and villages in Dehgolan County
Kurdish settlements in Kurdistan Province